Shields Creek is a stream in the U.S. state of Montana. It is a tributary to Bear Creek.

Shields Creek was named after Thomas Shields, a railroad agent.

References

Rivers of Montana
Rivers of Flathead County, Montana